Emily Howard (born 1979) is a British composer whose work is best known for its inventive connections with mathematical shapes and processes.

Early life 
Howard was born in Liverpool, England. After completing a degree in mathematics and computer science at Lincoln College, Oxford, Howard studied composition at the Royal Northern College of Music (MMus) and the University of Manchester (PhD).

Career 
In 2008, Howard was commissioned to write a work for the Royal Liverpool Philharmonic Orchestra to mark Liverpool's recognition as a European Capital of Culture in 2008. The resulting piece, Magnetite, received critical acclaim, and Howard went on to win an award from the Paul Hamlyn Foundation.

In 2010, Howard became the inaugural UBS Composer in Residence in conjunction with the London Symphony Orchestra (LSO) at the Bridge Academy in Hackney, writing Solar (2010) for the LSO conducted by Nicholas Collon, a work that the Financial Times praised for its ability 'to suggest galactic power on a compact scale'. In 2011, Howard's music was the focus of Wien Modern, which saw performances of Magnetite in the Musikverein (by the Tonkünstler Orchestra under Andrés Orozco-Estrada), Solar and Calculus of the Nervous System (2011) in the Wiener Konzerthaus (performed by the Vienna Radio Symphony Orchestra with Sir James MacMillan).

Meanwhile, Howard continued to explore musical wordplay and wrote the operatic biopic Zátopek!, commissioned by Second Movement as part of New Music 20x12 for the 2012 London Cultural Olympiad, and the Ada sketches, premiered at the Royal Opera House's Linbury Theatre. In the same year, Mesmerism, a Diamond Jubilee commission for the Liverpool Mozart Orchestra with pianist Alexandra Dariescu, won a British Composer Award.

Howard's work increasingly blurred the boundaries between art and science, although, as Simon Rattle once remarked 'her music doesn't feel the least bit mechanical – she has her own very particular sound world'. Howard collaborated with mathematician Marcus du Sautoy to create string quartet Four Musical Proofs and a Conjecture, which was premiered at the New Scientist Live Festival in 2017. In recent years, Howard has explored what she terms 'orchestral geometries', with several large-scale works that evoke shapes and processes. Torus, a 2016 BBC Proms commission, was described by the Times as 'visionary' and won the orchestral category of the 2017 British Composer Awards. Antisphere, the latest in the unofficial series, was commissioned by the Barbican for Rattle and the LSO, and opened the 2019-20 season.

That same year The Anvil: An Elegy for Peterloo, for orchestra, chorus and soloists with a text by Michael Symmons Roberts, was performed by Kate Royal, Christopher Purves, three Hallé Choirs, the BBC Singers and BBC Philharmonic under Ben Gernon at the Manchester International Festival, who described Howard as one of British music's 'most original voices'. Howard's music was also the subject of the Barbican's high-profile Life Rewired season in 2019, which explored artistic responses to society and technology. Howard curated 'Ada Lovelace: Imagining the Analytical Engine', an evening of new music and discussion in honour of mathematician Ada Lovelace.

Howard's first full-length opera, To See The Invisible (2018), was an Aldeburgh Festival commission with a text by Selma Dimitrijevic after a short sci-fi story by Robert Silverberg. The Telegraph remarked that the opera demonstrated that 'Howard’s idiom has a cool confidence and clarity of its own' while the Times observed that the achievement 'raised hopes for Howard’s future work'.

Alongside her artistic commitments, Howard is active as a researcher and teacher. In 2015, she was Leverhulme Trust Artist in Residence at the University of Liverpool’s Department of Mathematical Sciences.

In 2017, Howard co-launched PRiSM, the RNCM Centre for Practice & Research in Science & Music. In addition to her role as Director of PRiSM, Howard is Professor of Composition at the RNCM, where she has taught since 2010.

In 2019, Howard was a TORCH visiting research fellow at the University of Oxford and was elected honorary fellow of Oxford's Lincoln College.

Howard is based in Manchester and is represented by Cathy Nelson Artists & Projects. All works are published by Edition Peters.

Selected discography 
Magnetite (NMC), NMCD219 (2016)

Zátopek! (NMC), NMCDL2012-10 (2012)

Sky and Water featured in John McCabe: Farewell Recital (Toccata Classics), TOCC0139 (2011)

Wild Clematis in Winter featured in The NMC Songbook (NMC), NMCD150 (2009)

Outback in A Garland For John McCabe (Divine Art), DDA25166 (2018)

Masquerade for basset clarinet and piano featured in Prism: New Works for Clarinet (NMC), NMCD139 (2011)

Cloud Chamber featured in Paul Vowles's recital disc (Prima Facie), PFCD035 (2015)

Music style 
Howard uses a broad range of sonic colour, at times exploring the extremities of instrumental and vocal timbre. Architectural shape and narrative arc are important elements in her writing. The overlap between music, maths and computer science is reflected in some of the titles, for example Calculus of the Nervous System (2011) and the 2013 children's work Pi (a Pie?). Her interest in chess is also referenced in Chaos or Chess (2016), which borrows its title from a line written by poet Geoffrey Hill. Word-setting and word play are equally important features in Howard's oeuvre, such as the recent use of Ada Lovelace's text in the ‘But then, what are these numbers?’ (2019).

Personal 
Howard’s father used to play in the Liverpool Mozart Orchestra with Simon Rattle. The composer was British Junior Girls Chess Champion from 1990-1996.

Selected works

Works for orchestra 
 Antisphere (2019)
 sphere (2017)
 Torus (2016)
 Axon (2013)
 Calculus of the Nervous System (2011)
 Solar (2010)
 Magnetite (2007)

Chamber orchestra 
 Mesmerism (2011)
 Lachrymose (2006)
 Passacaglia (2002)

Orchestra with choir 
 The Anvil (2019)

Opera and vocal 
 To See The Invisible (2018)
 Zátopek! (2012)

Solo vocal 
 But then, what are these numbers? (2019)
 Threnos (2015)
 Ada sketches (2011)
 Songs from Dickens (2010)
 Wild Clematis in Winter (2008)

Choral 
 Two Songs after Friday Afternoons (2013)
 Ite Fortes (2006)

Ensemble 

 Carillon (2013)
 Settle (2010)
 Obsidian (2010)
 Broken Hierarchies (2008)
 Dualities (2005)

Chamber 

 Four Musical Proofs and a Conjecture (2017)
 Afference (2014)
 Deconstruction V (2012)
 Zugzwänge (2012)
 Broken Hierarchies II (2009)
 The Summoning of Mephisto (2007)

Solo 

 Outlier (2018)
 Chaos or Chess (2016)
 Orbits (2015)
 Leviathan (2015)
 Masquerade (2009)
 Cloud Chamber (2006)
 Sky and Water (2005)

Further reading 
 Axel Petri-Preis Emily Howard's Lovelace Trilogy: A Musical Homage to a Mathematical Pioneer, Tempo (Cambridge University Press 2013), Vol. 67, Issue No. 265 (July 2013) 
 Richard Morrison 'Emily Howard, a composer who counts', The Times (September 2019) (paywall)
 Laura Battle 'Calculated compositions', Financial Times (September 2011) (paywall)
 Emily Howard 'OK computer: how Ada Lovelace is being brought to musical life', The Guardian (November 2019)

References

External links 
 

1979 births
Musicians from Liverpool
British classical composers
20th-century classical composers
Women classical composers
Living people
20th-century British composers
British women composers
Alumni of the Royal Northern College of Music
21st-century classical composers
21st-century British composers
20th-century women composers
21st-century women composers
Alumni of Lincoln College, Oxford
Alumni of the University of Manchester